Jim Walton (3 June 1934 – 13 March 2013) was  a former Australian rules footballer who played with Richmond in the Victorian Football League (VFL).

Notes

External links 		
		
		
		
		
		
		
		
1934 births		
2013 deaths		
Australian rules footballers from Victoria (Australia)		
Richmond Football Club players
North Ballarat Football Club players